Michael McDerman (born August 10, 1977) is an American actor, comedian, and writer.

Early life
McDerman was born in Manhattan, New York. He is of Portuguese ancestry. He attended Baruch College graduating in 2006 with a bachelor's degree. While in college, he worked as an actor and drag queen.

Career
On September 16, 2003, McDerman appeared as his self-created alter ego, who he originated and portrayed, Carmella Cann', a drag queen judge on an episode of Ricki Lake entitled "How Straight Is He?" He has hosted many live events as Carmella Cann, including Rhode Island International Film Festival and The Original LGBT Expo in New York City.

He appeared on an episode of Law & Order: Special Victims Unit entitled "Brotherhood" in the role of Tyler Henry, a local fraternity pledge master that is sodomized and murdered, aired on January 6, 2004. Also, in 2004 he was in the stage play by H.M. Koutoukas, Ring of Death in the role of Vicar and Maid, at Theater for the New City, New York City. He has had an appearance on A&E (TV channel) 15 Films About Madonna, Z Rock, Viralcom, Under the Pink Carpet , One Life to Live, and the film's Voodoo You Believe and A Four Letter Word, directed by Casper Andreas. He appeared in 2006 in the television commercial for the New York Comedy Festival, alongside Jim Norton. He was featured in the book Straight Talk with Gay Guys: What Girlfriends Can't Tell You and Straight Men Won't by: Daylle Deanna Schwartz.

In 2008, McDerman used the screen name Michael Ferreira, when he wrote, produced, and starred in the semi-autobiographical short film It's Me, Matthew! as the title character, alongside the renowned Michael Musto. In 2013, he was the theatre director for the Off-Off-Broadway stage play by Jean Bergantini Grillo, That Afternoon at Fred Campballs at Times Square Art Center, in New York City. Cann is scheduled to Host the Original LGBT Expo in March 2016.

Filmography

Published works
McDerman, wrote "Leading Ladies: A brief history of gay culture and its Founding Mothers" published in Next Magazine (New York City) (USA) June 19, 2006, pg. 28–29.

Awards
McDerman, in 2008 shared a Juror Award at West Hollywood International Film Festival for the short film It's Me, Matthew!References

Further reading

Calabria, Karen. Karaoke With the Fabulous Carmella Cann''. Bay News (USA) November 3, 2003, Vol. 44, Iss. LV3, pg. 5.

External links
 Carmella Cann Official Website
 It's Me, Matthew!

Living people
American male television actors
1977 births
American gay actors
American gay writers
LGBT people from New York (state)
American male stage actors
American drag queens
Gay comedians
Nightlife in New York City
Baruch College alumni
American people of Portuguese descent
American LGBT comedians